7th Maine Light Artillery Battery was an artillery battery that served in the Union Army during the American Civil War.

Service
The 7th Maine Battery was organized in Augusta, Maine and mustered in for three years' service on December 30, 1863.

The battery was attached to 3rd Division, IX Corps, Army of the Potomac, to August 1864. Artillery Brigade, IX Corps, to June 1865.

The 7th Maine Battery mustered out of service June 21, 1865, at Augusta, Maine.

Detailed service
Left Maine for Washington, D.C., February 1, 1864. Duty at Camp Barry until April 25. Campaign from the Rapidan to the James River, Va., May 3-June 15, 1864. Battles of the Wilderness May 5–7; Spotsylvania May 8–12; Spotsylvania Court House May 12–21; North Anna May 23–26. Ox Ford May 23–24. Line of the Pamunkey May 26–28. Totopotomoy May 28–31. Cold Harbor June 1–12. Bethesda Church June 1–3. Before Petersburg June 16–18. Siege of Petersburg June 16, 1864, to April 2, 1865. Mine Explosion, Petersburg, July 30, 1864. Ream's Station August 25. Poplar Springs Church September 29-October 2. Pegram's Farm October 2. Garrison, Fort Welsh, until November 30, and Fort Sedgwick (Fort Hell) and Battery 21 until April 3, 1865. Assault on and capture of Petersburg April. 2-3. Pursuit of Lee April 4–9. At Farmville April 10–20. Moved to Washington, D.C., April 20–28, and camp near Fairfax Seminary to June 5. Grand Review of the Armies May 24. Moved to Augusta, Me., June 5–8.

Casualties
The battery lost a total of 40 enlisted men during service; 13 enlisted men killed or mortally wounded, 27 enlisted men died of disease.

Commanders
 Captain (Brevet Major) Adelbert B. Twitchell

Notable members
 Private James A. Roberts - lawyer and New York state politician

See also

 List of Maine Civil War units
 Maine in the American Civil War

References
 Dyer, Frederick H.  A Compendium of the War of the Rebellion (Des Moines, IA:  Dyer Pub. Co.), 1908.
 Lapham, William Berry.  My Recollections of the War of the Rebellion (Augusta, ME:  Burleigh & Flynt, Printers), 1892.
 Twitchell, Albert Sobieski.  History of the Seventh Maine Light Battery, Volunteers in the Great Rebellion (Boston, MA:  E. B. Stillings & Co.), 1892.
Attribution
 

Military units and formations established in 1863
Military units and formations disestablished in 1865
7th Maine Battery
1863 establishments in Maine
Artillery units and formations of the American Civil War